Piercing is a novel by Ryu Murakami. Originally published in Japanese in 1994, it was translated and published in English by Bloomsbury Publishing in 2008.  An American film adaptation starring Christopher Abbott and Mia Wasikowska, directed by Nicolas Pesce, was released in 2019.

Overview
Piercing is set in Tokyo and follows Kawashima Masayuki trying to come to terms with his overwhelming desire to stab his infant child with an ice pick. He resolves to divert the impulse into an unsuspecting prostitute. However, as he begins to execute his meticulous crime everything, including his past, begins to unravel.

Critical reception
"...a haunting Japanese version of a David Lynch nightmare" - Chris Petit, Guardian Book Review.

"Far from being a cheap gorefest, ‘Piercing’ handles its violence with controlled aplomb, making it seem a natural by-product of Tokyo’s economic dominance. The result is a brief and convincing narrative of a crime and its motivations. With simple language and vividly evoked images, the novel looks at a single moment of horror from every angle." - Ed King, Time Out Book Review.

References

External links

Ryu Murakami at Bloomsbury Publishing

1994 Japanese novels
Japanese-language novels
Japanese novels adapted into films
Novels by Ryū Murakami
Novels set in Tokyo
Bloomsbury Publishing books
Psychological thriller novels